Amir Hussain is a scholar of religion who specializes in the study of Islam. Currently, he is chair of the Department of Theological Studies at Loyola Marymount University in Los Angeles. In November 2022 he became President of the American Academy of Religion. He has done significant publishing work with Oxford University Press, including editing the fifth editions (2018) of two of their main textbooks, World Religions: Western Traditions and World Religions: Eastern Traditions, and the third edition of A Concise Introduction to World Religions.

Early and personal life
Born in Lahore, Pakistan, and raised in Toronto, Ontario, Canada, Hussain received a Ph.D. and M.A. in the study of religion from the University of Toronto. He speaks fluently in four languages, including: Arabic, English, French, and Urdu.

Hussain is a lifelong fan of the Los Angeles Lakers and the Montreal Canadiens.

Career
Before moving to Loyola Marymount University, Hussain taught as an Associate Professor of Religious Studies at California State University, Northridge.

A proponent of interfaith dialogue, Professor Hussain has published over 60 scholarly articles or book chapters on Islam and Muslims. He has lectured in academic arenas around the world, and appeared on several television programs, most notably Politically Incorrect with Bill Maher and The Tavis Smiley Show. He is a consultant for The Story of God with Morgan Freeman.

Professor Hussain is also a senior editor for religion for Oxford Handbooks Online. Prior to his edited textbooks, he wrote Muslims and the Making of America, published in 2016 by Baylor University Press. From 2011 to 2015 he was the editor of the Journal of the American Academy of Religion, the flagship journal for the study of religion. He is also on the editorial boards of four other scholarly journals for the study of religion. In 2005, he joined the Department of Theological Studies at Loyola Marymount University, the Jesuit university in Los Angeles. He has written numerous scholarly articles on Islam and Muslims, and is recognized as an authority on Islam in North America. He is a fellow of the Los Angeles Institute for the Humanities.

Works
Oil and Water: Two Faiths, One God, (Wood Lake Books, 2006)
A Concise Introduction to World Religions, third edition (Oxford University Press, 2015)
Muslims and the Making of America, (Baylor University Press, 2016)
World Religions: Western Traditions, fifth edition (Oxford University Press, 2018)
World Religions: Eastern Traditions, fifth edition (Oxford University Press, 2018)

Notes

21st-century Muslim scholars of Islam
Living people
University of Toronto alumni
California State University, Northridge faculty
Loyola Marymount University faculty
Academic journal editors
Canadian academics
Canadian editors
Journalists from Toronto
Pakistani emigrants to Canada
Naturalized citizens of Canada
Year of birth missing (living people)